Harold Newton (October 30 1934–1994) was an American landscape artist. He was a founding member of the Florida Highwaymen, a group of fellow African American landscape artists. Newton and the other Highwaymen were influenced by the work of Florida painter A.E. Backus. Newton depicted Florida’s coastlines and wetlands. Most of his paintings were of Florida landscapes.

Newton was successful in a time of racial segregation and disenfranchisement. He died in 1994, a year after suffering a debilitating stroke. He was 59 years old.

References

 Beaty, Bob, Florida's Highwaymen, Legendary Landscapes, Historical Society of Central Florida, 2005. 
 Fitch, Jim, "The Highwaymen...Updated"
 LeBlanc, Bob,  "The Original Highwayman's Self Portrait" 2008
 Onajídé Shabaka, Highwaymen Alfred Hair and Harold Newton, Miami Art Exchange, 18 June, 2006 
 LeBlanc, Bob, "Interpreting Harold Newton Prices" Aug. 2010 

1934 births
1994 deaths
Artists from Florida